Scandal Sheet is a 1952 American film noir directed by Phil Karlson. The film is based on the novel The Dark Page by Samuel Fuller, who himself was a newspaper reporter before his career in film. The drama features Broderick Crawford, Donna Reed and John Derek.

Plot
Mark Chapman (Broderick Crawford), editor of the New York Express, has made the newspaper a success by pursuing sensationalism and yellow journalism. His protégé is ace reporter Steve McCleary (John Derek), while successful feature writer Julie Allison (Donna Reed) is frustrated by the paper's drift towards raking the muck. One night, during a lonely hearts dance organized by the Express, Chapman's estranged wife (Rosemary De Camp) confronts him and demands he visit her hotel room. It is revealed that Chapman's real name is George Grant, and he abandoned his wife decades earlier, changing his identity. When Chapman rebuffs her efforts toward reconciliation, she threatens to publicize his real identity. Chapman tries to restrain her, accidentally killing her in the scuffle.

Chapman attempts to cover up his crime, posing the scene to look like an accident. The police initially believe she slipped in the bathtub, but McCleary begins covering the case, and his reporting reveals it was a murder. McCleary is eager to run the story, and Chapman must acquiesce to avoid suspicion. The "mystery" murderer is dubbed the "Lonely Hearts Killer." Charlie Barnes (Henry O'Neill), an alcoholic former star reporter and Pulitzer Prize winner, stumbles upon the dead woman's suitcase, in which he finds wedding photographs showing Chapman (then Grant) and his wife. He realizes that Chapman must be the killer. Barnes contacts Allison, who has been kind to him, attempting to give her the scoop, but Chapman overhears the conversation. He intercepts and kills Barnes before he can reveal the truth to a rival publication. This act only increases public interest in the story of the Lonely Hearts Killer, much to Chapman's frustration.

Assisted by Allison, McCleary continues to track down clues and leads. Eventually he locates another photo from Chapman/Grant's wedding, although the groom is shot in profile and it is not obvious that it is Chapman. McCleary and Allison travel to Connecticut to find the judge who married the murdered woman and the man in the photograph. After a week of searching, they identify the judge who conducted the marriage. They bring him back to the newspaper building, where he identifies Chapman as the groom and thus the Lonely Hearts Killer. McCleary is incredulous, but Allison puts the pieces together and the desperate Chapman pulls a gun on them. The police arrive, and Chapman cannot bring himself to shoot McCleary. Instead, he gives McCleary his blessing to publish all details of his crimes and then commits suicide by cop.

Cast
 Broderick Crawford as Mark Chapman
 Donna Reed as Julie Allison
 John Derek as Steve McCleary
 Rosemary DeCamp as Charlotte Grant
 Henry O'Neill as Charlie Barnes
 Harry Morgan as Biddle (billed as Henry Morgan)
 James Millican as Lt. Davis
 Griff Barnett as Judge Elroy Hacker
 Jonathan Hale as Frank Madison

Production
Film rights to Sam Fuller's novel were sold for $15,000 to Howard Hawks during the war. After the war Fuller did a treatment and Sidney Buchman wrote a script, which Hawks then sold to Edward Small for $100,000. John Payne was originally offered the lead, then Dennis O'Keefe and Orson Welles were announced as stars.

Reception
New York Times film critic Bosley Crowther was lukewarm about the film, writing, "The ruthlessness of tabloid journalism, as seen through the coolly searching eyes of Hollywood scriptwriters (who naturally shudder with shock at such a thing), is given another demonstration in Columbia's Scandal Sheet, a run-of-the-press melodrama which came to the Paramount yesterday. But apart from a bit of tough discussion of the public's avid taste for thrills and chills and a few dubious hints at tabloid techniques, there is nothing very shocking in this film ... The moral of all this dismal nonsense, we would gather, is meant to be that corruption breeds corruption. The moral is okay. Enough said."

In 2005 critic Dennis Schwartz called the drama a "hard-hitting film noir thriller" and liked the camera work.  He wrote, "Burnett Guffey's splashy black-and-white photography is filled with New York City atmosphere and the whirlwind energy buzzing around a press room."

Preservation
The Academy Film Archive preserved Scandal Sheet in 1997.

References

External links
 
 
 
 
 

1952 films
1952 crime drama films
American black-and-white films
American crime drama films
Columbia Pictures films
1950s English-language films
Film noir
Films about journalists
Films based on American novels
Films directed by Phil Karlson
Films produced by Edward Small
Films scored by George Duning
Films set in New York City
Films with screenplays by James Poe
1950s American films